The military campaigns of the Samnite Wars were an important stage in Roman expansion in the Italian Peninsula.

Background
The Samnites were a group of hill-tribes occupying the central Apennines.  In the mid-4th century B.C. they began to expand into the territories of their neighbours, especially in Campania and the Liris valley. In the 4th century (B.C.), the cities of northern Campania had rallied around the leadership of the largest city, Capua. These Campani fought against the Samnites to the east. During the 4th-century, the Samnites grew to become the strongest group in the central highlands.  At first, they had enemies in common with Rome in the Celts and Volsci, and this commonality of purpose led to the formation of a peace treaty with Rome in 354. Once these threats were removed, Samnium expansion brought them into conflict with Rome's growing influence in central Italy. Samnites were the only ones who possessed nearly equivalent power in Italy as to that of Romans; so that the Roman-Samnite wars determined which would be the leading power in Italy.

First Samnite War (343-341 BC) 
In the late 340s and early 330s, Roman armies fought Latins, Volsci, Campanians, and possibly Samnites, while Campanians and Samnites also conducted wars of their own. These conflicts were marked with shifting alliances that would greatly confuse later Roman writers. At some point, Capua and its allies appealed to Rome for help against the Samnites, who were pressing against communities in the lower Volturnus River Valley, one of the chief routes from the Samnite highlands to the coastal plains of Southern Latium and Campania. The results is what would later be called the First Samnites War, although it is unclear how much fighting between the Romans and Samnites actually occurred.

Second Samnite War (326-304 BC) 
The Second Samnite War broke out in 326 BC over Rome's attempts at colonizing Fregellae, which the Samnites considered their own. This quickly ended at the Battle of the Caudine Forks. The Romans gave up their colonies at Fregellae and Cales. The fighting resumed in 316 BC. For the next few years, Roman historians record Samnite invasions of Latium and Campania, but Rome's armies did recover and would then invade Samnium yearly until peace was made in 304 BC.

In addition to the gain of territory, some ancient sources suggest that the Romans adopted the manipular military formation of the Samnites as a result of their early successes. This formation later evolved into a military tactic that would allow the conquering of much of Europe.

Third Samnite War (298 to 290 BC)

According to Livy and Dionysius of Halicarnassus the war originated with a Samnite attack on the Lucanians. Romans began activities in Lucania which ignited hostilities. Unable to resist, the Lucanians sent ambassadors and hostages to Rome to plead for an alliance. The Romans decided to accept the alliance offer and sent fetials to insist the Samnites evacuate Lucania, but they refused and the war began. In 295 BC, the Romans defeated Samnites, Umbrians, and Gauls in the Battle of Sentinum in Umbria. In 291, a Roman consul defeated the Samnites at Aquilonia and established the colony of Venusia. The Samnites made peace again. This war secured Rome's leadership in Italy.

See also
 List of Roman wars and battles

Sources

Boatwright, Mary T., Daniel J. Gargola, Noel Lenski, and Richard J. A. Talbert. The Romans: From Village to Empire: A History of Rome from Earliest Times to the End of the Western Empire, 2nd edition. Oxford University Press, 2012.

References

Lists of battles